Krzysztof Kisiel (born 19 July 1969) is a Polish handball coach for Wybrzeże Gdańsk.

References

1969 births
Living people
People from Legionowo County
Sportspeople from Masovian Voivodeship
Polish handball coaches